The Jan Shakti Party of India is a registered political party in the Indian state of Punjab. The JSPI was founded on 17 March 2015 by a group of social activists of Ludhiana city. The JSPI is currently led by Gurjeet Singh Azad.

References

External links

Timeline

Political parties in India
Political parties established in 2015
2015 establishments in Punjab, India